Appleford Railway Bridge carries the Cherwell Valley Line from Didcot to Oxford across the River Thames near the village of Appleford-on-Thames, Oxfordshire, England. It crosses the Thames on the reach between Clifton Lock and Culham Lock.

Originally, a timber bridge was built at the approximate location of the present bridge; by December 1843, it was reportedly under construction, and was completed during the following year. By the 1850s, it has been replaced by a more substantial bridge principally composed of wrought iron so that heavier trains could be run along the line. A third bridge was completed in 1927, which was built out of steel; it is this structure that is presently used as of the 2010s.

See also
 Crossings of the River Thames

References

External links

 Appleford Railway Bridge via structurae.net
 Appleford Railway Bridge, River Thames via geograph.org.uk
 Appleford Railway Bridge via thames.me.uk

Railway bridges in Oxfordshire
Bridges across the River Thames